Doyran Heights are the heights rising to 3473 m at Mount Tuck in the east foothills of Vinson Massif and Craddock Massif in Sentinel Range, Ellsworth Mountains in Antarctica, extending 30.8 km in north–south direction and 16.5 km in east–west direction.  They are bounded by Thomas Glacier to the south and southwest, Dater Glacier and Hansen Glacier to the northwest and north, and Sikera Valley to the east, linked to Craddock Massif to the west by Goreme Col, and separated from Veregava Ridge to the north by Manole Pass and from Flowers Hills to the northeast by Kostinbrod Pass. Their interior is drained by Guerrero, Hough, Remington and Obelya Glaciers.

The heights are named after the settlements of Doyrantsi in Northeastern and Southern Bulgaria.

Location
US mapping in 1961, updated in 1988.

See also
 Mountains in Antarctica

Geographical features include:

 Beloslav Peak
 Goreme Col
 Guerrero Glacier
 Hansen Glacier
 Hough Glacier
 Johnson Spur
 Kostinbrod Pass
 Manole Pass
 McPherson Peak
 Midzhur Peak
 Mount Benson
 Mount Havener
 Mount Mohl
 Mount Tuck
 Prosenik Peak
 Remington Glacier
 Sikera Valley
 Taylor Spur

Maps
 Vinson Massif.  Scale 1:250 000 topographic map.  Reston, Virginia: US Geological Survey, 1988.
 Antarctic Digital Database (ADD). Scale 1:250000 topographic map of Antarctica. Scientific Committee on Antarctic Research (SCAR). Since 1993, regularly updated.

Notes

References
 Doyran Heights. SCAR Composite Antarctic Gazetteer.
 Bulgarian Antarctic Gazetteer. Antarctic Place-names Commission. (details in Bulgarian, basic data in English)

External links
 Doyran Heights. Adjusted Copernix satellite image

Mountains of Ellsworth Land
Bulgaria and the Antarctic